Vallapuram is a village and Gram panchayat of Nadigudem mandal, Nalgonda district, in Telangana state.

References

Villages in Khammam district